Yenipazar ("new market") is a town and a small district of Aydın Province in the Aegean region of Turkey,  from the city of Aydın on the road to Denizli.

Yenipazar itself is a quiet rural town of 6,423 people providing university, high and elementary school education and other facilities to the surrounding districts. In the last two decades the population has declined as people move to Turkey's larger cities for higher education and careers and Yenipazar is selected as one of the Cittaslow towns in Turkey. The local cuisine includes a delicious flat-bread pizza called pide. Adnan Menderes University has a school here offering diplomas in banking and finance. The student population created new income opportunities for the residents of this small town. Social life is also impacted positively from the university, you can find many restaurants and cafes than you would expect from a town of this size.

Places of interest
 The house of prominent local Turkish War of Independence resistance leader Yörük Ali Efe is now a museum to his life and career.

References

External links 
 
 local information 
 Yenipazar hunting club photo album

Populated places in Aydın Province
Cittaslow
Districts of Aydın Province
Yenipazar District